Denis Aleksandrovich Kudryavtsev (born 13 April 1992) is a Russian athlete specialising in the 400 metres hurdles.

Career 
He won silver medal at the 2015 World Championships and the bronze medal at the 2014 European Championships. Earlier he represented his country at the 2013 World Championships without qualifying for the semifinals.

His personal best in the event is 48.05 seconds set at the 2015 World Championships final in Beijing. That time is also a Russian record.

Competition record

References

1992 births
Living people
Sportspeople from Chelyabinsk
Russian male hurdlers
World Athletics Championships athletes for Russia
World Athletics Championships medalists
European Athletics Championships medalists
Russian Athletics Championships winners